Actinostola is a genus of sea anemones in the order Actiniaria. All members of this genus are deep-sea species, with some occurring at hydrothermal vents.

Species
The following species are recognised by the World Register of Marine Species:

Actinostola abyssorum (Danielssen, 1890)
Actinostola bulbosa (Carlgren, 1928)
Actinostola callosa (Verrill, 1882)
Actinostola capensis (Carlgren, 1928)
Actinostola carlgreni Wassilieff, 1908
Actinostola chilensis McMurrich, 1904
Actinostola crassicornis (Hertwig, 1882)
Actinostola faeculenta (McMurrich, 1893)
Actinostola georgiana Carlgren, 1927
Actinostola groenlandica Carlgren, 1899
Actinostola kerguelensis Carlgren, 1928

References

Taxa named by Addison Emery Verrill
Actinostolidae
Hexacorallia genera